Auguste Baarendse (born 15 September 1931) is a Belgian wrestler. He competed in the men's freestyle heavyweight at the 1952 Summer Olympics.

References

External links
 

1931 births
Possibly living people
Belgian male sport wrestlers
Olympic wrestlers of Belgium
Wrestlers at the 1952 Summer Olympics
Sportspeople from Antwerp